Shchyolkovo or Shchelkovo is the name of several inhabited localities in Russia.

Urban localities
Shchyolkovo, a city in Shchyolkovsky District of Moscow Oblast

Rural localities
Shchelkovo, Nizhny Novgorod Oblast, a village under the administrative jurisdiction of the work settlement of Tumbotino in Pavlovsky District of Nizhny Novgorod Oblast
Shchelkovo, Kalyazinsky District, Tver Oblast, a village in Kalyazinsky District, Tver Oblast
Shchelkovo, Kashinsky District, Tver Oblast, a village in Kashinsky District, Tver Oblast
Shchelkovo, Kimrsky District, Tver Oblast, a village in Kimrsky District, Tver Oblast
Shchelkovo, Konakovsky District, Tver Oblast, a village in Konakovsky District, Tver Oblast
Shchelkovo, Rzhevsky District, Tver Oblast, a village in Rzhevsky District, Tver Oblast
Shchelkovo, Ferapontovsky Selsoviet, Kirillovsky District, Vologda Oblast, a village in Ferapontovsky Selsoviet of Kirillovsky District of Vologda Oblast
Shchelkovo, Goritsky Selsoviet, Kirillovsky District, Vologda Oblast, a village in Goritsky Selsoviet of Kirillovsky District of Vologda Oblast
Shchelkovo, Mezhdurechensky District, Vologda Oblast, a village in Staroselsky Selsoviet of Mezhdurechensky District of Vologda Oblast
Shchelkovo, Yaroslavl Oblast, a village in Osetsky Rural Okrug of Lyubimsky District of Yaroslavl Oblast